An international chess tournament was held in London, during the second British world exhibition, in 1862.

The prizes were won by Adolf Anderssen (£100), Louis Paulsen (£50), John Owen (£30), George Alcock MacDonnell (£15), Serafino Dubois (£10) and Wilhelm Steinitz (£5) who was awarded the brilliancy prize for his win over Augustus Mongredien.
 
The final results and standings:

{|class="wikitable"
! # !! Player !! 1 !! 2 !! 3 !! 4 !! 5 !! 6 !! 7 !! 8 !! 9 !! 10 !! 11 !! 12 !! 13 !! 14 !! Total
|-
| 1|| ||x|| 1|| 0|| 1|| 1|| 1|| 1|| 1|| 1|| -|| 1|| 1|| r1|| 1|| 11 
|-
| 2||
|| 0 ||x|| 1|| 1|| 0|| 1|| r1|| 1|| r1|| -|| 1|| -|| 1|| 1|| 9
|-
| 3|| || 1|| 0|| x|| 0|| r|| r1|| 1|| 1|| 0|| -|| 1|| -|| rr1|| rr1|| 7
|-
| 4|| || 0|| 0|| 1|| x|| 0|| 1|| -|| 0|| 1|| -|| 1|| 1|| 1|| 1|| 7 
|-
| 5|| || 0|| 1|| r|| 1|| x|| 0|| 1|| 1|| r|| -|| -|| -|| r1|| 1|| 6
|-
| 6|| || 0|| 0|| r0|| 0|| 1|| x|| 1|| 1|| 0|| -|| 1|| -|| 1|| rr1|| 6
|-
| 7||  || 0|| r0|| 0|| -|| 0|| 0|| x|| r1|| 1|| 0|| 1|| r1|| 1|| 1|| 6 
|-
| 8|||| 0|| 0|| 0|| 1|| 0|| 0|| r0|| x|| 1|| -|| -|| -|| 1|| 1|| 4 
|-
| 9||  || 0|| r0|| 1|| 0|| r|| 1|| 0|| 0|| x|| -|| 0|| 0|| rr|| 1|| 3 
|-
| 10||  || -|| -|| -|| -|| -|| -|| 1|| -|| -|| x|| -|| -|| 1|| 1|| 3 
|-
| 11|||| 0|| 0|| 0|| 0|| -|| 0|| 0|| -|| 1|| -|| x|| 1|| 0|| 0|| 2 
|-
| 12|| || 0|| -|| -|| 0|| -|| -|| r0|| -|| 1|| -|| 0|| x|| 0|| 1|| 2 
|-
| 13|| || r0|| 0|| rr0|| 0|| r0|| 0|| 0|| 0|| rr|| 0|| 1|| 1|| x|| 0|| 2 
|-
| 14|||| 0|| 0|| rr0|| 0|| 0|| rr0|| 0|| 0|| 0|| 0|| 1|| 0|| 1|| x|| 2 
|}

References

Literature
 Löwenthal, Johann Jacob "The Chess Congress of 1862", Henry G. Bohn, York Street, Covent Garden, London, 1864

Chess competitions
1862 in chess
1862 in English sport
1862 in London
Chess 1862 London tournament
June 1862 sports events
International sports competitions in London